The following is a list of notable events and releases that happened in 2001 in music in South Korea.

Debuting and disbanded in 2001

Debuting groups

5tion
Clazziquai Project
Electron Sheep
The Geeks
The Jadu
Jewelry
jtL
KISS
K'Pop
M.I.L.K
Nell
Oh! Brothers
Turtles

Solo debuts

Cha Tae-hyun
 Dana
 Haneul
 Harisu
 Jang Na-ra
 Kang Sunghoon
 Kangta
 Kim Jong-kook
 Lee Jaijin
 Lucid Fall
 Moon Heejun
 Shin Ji
 Sung Si-kyung
 Psy
Yiruma
Yoon Mi-rae

Disbanded groups
H.O.T.
Papaya
Roo'ra

Releases in 2001

January

February

March

April

May

June

July

August

September

October

November

December

See also
2001 in South Korea
List of South Korean films of 2001

References

 
South Korean music
K-pop